The Godeffroy (Scolecenchelys godeffroyi) is an eel in the family Ophichthidae (worm/snake eels). It was described by Charles Tate Regan in 1909, originally under the genus Muraenichthys. It is a marine, tropical eel which is known from the western Pacific Ocean.

References

Fish described in 1909
godeffroyi